The A20 motorway is a motorway in the Netherlands. It is approximately 39 kilometers (25 miles) in length.

The A20 is entirely located in the Dutch province South Holland and connects the N213 road from the Westland municipality with the cities of Rotterdam and Gouda, where it connects to the A12 motorway at the interchange Gouwe.

Rotterdam 

The section near Rotterdam, between the interchanges with the A4 and A16 motorways, is the northern part of the so-called Ring Rotterdam, the beltway around the city.

On a part of this section, the maximum speed is reduced to 80 km/h (50 mph), which is being enforced by speed cameras calculating the average speed of a vehicle on the stretch between the cameras.

European routes 

From the first exit, exit 6 (Maasdijk), the European route E25 follows the A20 motorway all the way to its terminus at interchange Gouwe.

Besides, the European route E19 follows the A20 along the 6 kilometers (4 miles) short stretch between interchanges Kleinpolderplein and Terbregseplein, just north of Rotterdam.

Exit list 
The entire route is in South Holland.

External links

Motorways in the Netherlands
Motorways in South Holland